The Theseus Painter was a decorator of vases in the black-figure style, active in Attica c. 515 to 475 BCE.  He was the leading producer of larger Heron Class skyphoi.

Life and work 
The true name of the Theseus Painter and the circumstances of his life have not been preserved. He is conventionally called the Theseus Painter because of the frequency with which he and his followers depicted various episodes of the Theseid, the peregrinations of Theseus.

Stylistic evidence indicates that he was contemporaneous with and a "dominant influence" among the Sub-krokotos group, and was perhaps a student of Pamphaios.  He established his own workshop in Attica with the Athena Painter, and together they specialized in the production of skyphoi, lekythoi, and oinochoai in the black-figure style.

Although the more fashionable red-figure style had largely displaced the black-figure style at the turn of the sixth century, his work nonetheless enjoyed a certain measure of popularity, being found as far afield as Thasos to the north, Cyrene to the south, Rhodes to the east, and the far coast of Italy and Sicily to the west. He was a prolific artist, and stood out among practitioners of the obsolescent black-figure style by virtue of his skilful and inventive work.

Notes

References 

Ancient Greek vase painters
Ancient Greek artists